San Vicente is one of 28 parishes (administrative divisions) in Salas, a municipality within the province and autonomous community of Asturias, in northern Spain.

Villages
 Aciana 
 Casandresín (Casandrés)
 Fontanós 
 La Festiella 
 Poles (Poules)

References

Parishes in Salas